Pattison College is a non-selective independent school in the east of Coventry, England. Pattison College provides education for children aged 3 to 16 of all abilities. The school was established in 1949.

In January 2006, Pattison College was placed seventh nationally, according to the Value Added Measure, which rates progress made from Key Stage 3 to GCSE. In 2004, it was eleventh for progress made from Key Stage 2 to GCSE and sixteenth in 2003.

The school passed Ofsted inspection in November 2004 and January 2005 (Early Years). A 100% A-C GCSE result rate was achieved in 2004, 2002, 2001, 2000, 1999 & 1998 examinations.

The school is not academically selective and says it will accept pupils who it considers would benefit from a "traditional education where discipline, hard work, consideration for others and good manners are an important part of the school ethos".

The performing arts (dance, drama and music) are an integral part of the curriculum in the prep school and feature strongly in the extracurricular activities in the senior school.

Three-year musical theatre course 
Pattison College's three-year musical theatre course prepares students aged 16+ for careers both as performers and teachers. They recognise that commercial theatre demands all round training to enable students to enter their chosen profession with the necessary skills and qualifications in dance, drama and singing.

Notable former pupils

Richard Armitage, actor

External links

Private schools in Coventry

Educational institutions established in 1949
1949 establishments in England